Hely Yánes (born May 25, 1967) is a male light-middleweight boxer from Venezuela, who represented his native country at the 2000 Summer Olympics in Sydney, Australia. There he was defeated in the second round of the men's light-middleweight division (– 71 kg) by Kazakhstan's eventual gold medalist Yermakhan Ibraimov. Yánes also competed at the 1999 Pan American Games in Winnipeg, Manitoba, Canada, where he lost in the quarterfinals to Cuba's eventual gold medalist Jorge Gutiérrez.

References

1999 Pan American Games

1967 births
Living people
Light-middleweight boxers
Competitors at the 1998 Central American and Caribbean Games
Central American and Caribbean Games gold medalists for Venezuela
Boxers at the 1999 Pan American Games
Pan American Games competitors for Venezuela
Boxers at the 2000 Summer Olympics
Olympic boxers of Venezuela
Venezuelan male boxers
Central American and Caribbean Games medalists in boxing